Carabao Dang Energy Drink ("red water buffalo") is a Thai energy drink launched in 2002 by Carabao Tawandang Co Ltd. It is now Thailand's second most popular energy drink. It is the key brand of Carabao Tawandang in Thailand, with an estimated 21 per cent market share in 2014.

The name "Carabao Dang" comes from the Carabao Group's association with the band Carabao, combined with the German Tawandang Brewery Restaurant. It is marketed with the slogan "Carabao Dang: The Fighting Spirit".

The drink's launch was accompanied by a high-profile TV advertising campaign featuring the company founder (along with Sathien Setthasit), rock star Yuenyong Opakul, also known as Aed Carabao. This campaign was investigated by the Office of the Consumer Protection Board for being too violent, but went on to win a gold and a silver medal at Media & Marketing magazine's Asian Brand Marketing Effectiveness Awards in 2003. A second ad, featuring clips of late actor Denholm Elliott, digitally altered so he was drinking Carabao from a trough, was less successful.

The drink was introduced to the United States and Europe under the brand name Carabao leading to an increase in sales of the Thai brand on the west coast of the US in 2004. Exports to China and India began in 2007. Carabao was introduced in Australia at the beginning of 2018.

Market and share
The market for energy drinks in Thailand is estimated at 35 billion baht in 2018. Carabao research indicates that more than eight million Thais consume energy drinks. Nineteen per cent live in Bangkok, 32 per cent in other urban areas and 49 per cent in rural provinces. Carabao aims to increase its market share from 25 per cent in 2018 to 33 per cent in 2020, making it the leader in the domestic energy drinks market. Carabao Group expects 2018 revenues to reach 15 billion baht, up from 13 billion baht in 2017.

Production
Carabao completed work on a new production site in the Bang Pakong District of Chachoengsao Province in mid-2018. The 8.7 billion baht, 180 rai facility includes a glass bottle plant, an aluminium can plant, and a bottling plant. Bottle production will increase to 1.6 billion bottles per year, up from 1 billion, and can production will increase from 800 million per year to 1.5 billion. Future plans include a fourth factory on the site.

Sponsorship 
Carabao signed a sponsorship deal with Chelsea as the official training wear partner in 2015. Carabao's logo will feature on Chelsea's training kits from the 2016-17 season onwards.

Carabao signed a sponsorship deal with Reading as the primary shirt sponsor in 2016.

Carabao became the EFL Cup title sponsor (with the competition renamed as the Carabao Cup) from the 2017-18 season onwards.

In 2023, Carabao become sponsor of V.League 1 club Hoàng Anh Gia Lai.

For season 2022/23, Carabao became an official partner to Heart of Midlothian (in Scottish Premier League). Part of this partnership is to support charity by contributing £1 for every case purchased to Big Hearts Community Trust.

References

External links 
 Official website

Energy drinks
Thai drink brands